The Push may refer to:

 Sydney Push, left-wing intellectual subculture of Sydney, Australia
 Rocks Push, a criminal gang which was based around the rocks area of Sydney
 The Push, a 2018 sports documentary film directed by Grant Korgan and Geoff Callan

See also
 Push (disambiguation)